To Serve and Protect is a 1988 role-playing game adventure published by Hero Games for Champions.

Contents
To Serve and Protect is a mini-series adventure that involves superheroes who go out of control.

Reception
David Rogers reviewed To Serve and Protect in Space Gamer/Fantasy Gamer No. 84. Rogers commented that "I recommend this book, with reservations. The heros and villains are interesting and useful outside the context of this adventure, though you may want to use some of the heros as bad guys, since it seems to make sense in some cases. The hero base and skycruiser, the museum and agency are also useful in other contexts, and the main evil-doer is interesting enough to return for further villainy."

References

Champions (role-playing game) adventures
Role-playing game supplements introduced in 1988